{{Infobox song
| name       = Run
| cover      = Amy-macdonald-run.jpg
| alt        =
| type       = single
| artist     = Amy Macdonald
| album      = This Is the Life
| A-side     = Run
| B-side     = Rock N Roll Star
| released   =  (Germany)
| recorded   = 2008
| studio     =
| venue      =
| genre      = Indie rock, alternative rock, soft rock
| length     =
| label      =
| writer     = Amy Macdonald
| producer   = Pete Wilkinson
| prev_title = This Is the Life
| prev_year  = 2007
| next_title = Poison Prince" Re-Release'
| next_year  = 2008
}}

"Run" is the fifth single released from Amy Macdonald's debut album, This Is the Life''. The single was released in the UK on 3 March 2008 and peaked at #75 in the United Kingdom for 1 week.  Macdonald stated on stage at T in the Park 2008 that the song was inspired by a gig by The Killers in her hometown of Glasgow.

Track listing 
2-Track 
"Run" 03:48
"Rock 'n' Roll Star (Acoustic Version)" 02:22

Maxi (Germany)
"Run" 03:48
"Youth of Today (Live from SWR3 New Pop Festival 2008)" 04:02
"Dancing in the Dark (Live from SWR3 New Pop Festival 2008)" 03:27
"Run" (Videoclip)

Digital Download – EP
"Run" 3:48
"Dancing in the Dark"
"Run" (Live at Barrowland Ballroom)
"Run" (Steve Cradock version)

Music video 
The music video for "Run" features Macdonald walking through a forest at night.

Charts 
Macdonald's single "Run" was released on 3 March and jumped in the top 75 at number 75,next week it was knocked out of the top 75. Run charted at #36 in Germany.

References

External links
 "Run" video on Macdonald's official YouTube channel

2008 singles
Amy Macdonald songs
Songs written by Amy Macdonald
2008 songs